Torfaen Museum (Welsh: Amgueddfa Torfaen)  formerly the Valley Inheritance Museum and Amgueddfa Pontypool Museum is an accredited museum located in Pontypool, Torfaen, South Wales. It is managed by the Torfaen Museum Trust. The museum is situated within the Georgian stable block that once formed part of residence of the Hanbury family local ironmasters during the 18th and 19th centuries.

Collections
The museum has permanent and visiting exhibitions throughout the year detailing the industrial, social and cultural heritage and history of the Torfaen valley and Pontypool. Collections include local artefacts (clocks, household objects, ephemera) and a large collection of Pontypool & Usk Japanware, which was produced from the mid-18th century.  Local artists show at the museum.

The Dobell-Moseley Library & Archive is available for doing research into the local area.

External links 
Amgueddfa Torfaen Museum website
Gathering the Jewels Welsh website — details a few items held at Amgueddfa Torfaen Museum

Art museums and galleries in Wales
History of Monmouthshire
Decorative arts museums in Wales
Museums in Torfaen
Local museums in Wales
Pontypool